Neyyoor is a panchayat town in Kanniyakumari district in the Indian state of Tamil Nadu.

Demographics
 India census, Neyyoor had a population of 9,479. Males constitute 49% of the population and females 51%. Neyyoor has an average literacy rate of 83%, higher than the national average of 59.5%: male literacy is 83%, and female literacy is 82%. In Neyyoor, 10% of the population is under 6 years of age.

References

Cities and towns in Kanyakumari district